Breakwater Chicago is a proposed vessel being designed as a part island, part yacht resort, situated on Lake Michigan in the United States, floating about 1.1 miles off Chicago's shore line. 

The proposed Breakwater Chicago vessel will be about the size of an American football field (approximately 300 feet x 100 feet), and is planned to include sun-decks, restaurants, a large swimming pool, and shops.

Development
The concept for Breakwater Chicago was developed by local entrepreneur Beau D'Arcy. The architect of record for the design of the vessel is Chicago-based firm Space Architects + Planners. The entire project is estimated to cost about $23 million. Water taxis would take people to the resort, and people would also be able to dock boats at 30 slips. The vessel would have a capacity of 2,850 people, and would be moored on the lake with an anchoring system, called "spuds", that would rest on top of the lake-bed, and could be pulled up in case of a weather emergency so the vessel could be moved to another location. 

The project is currently in its design phase with construction planned for the summer of 2015. The project was announced to the public on June 9, 2014, alongside a crowdfunding campaign on Kickstarter, which raised more than $60,000 in donations from local supporters in the first month.

See also
MV Protector used as a marina breakwater on Lake Washington

References

Boats
Resorts in the United States
Restaurants in Chicago
Nightclubs in Chicago
Lake Michigan